Bruno Lanvin is the Executive Director for Global Indices at INSEAD. From 2007 to 2012, he was the Executive Director of INSEAD’s eLab, managing INSEAD’s teams in Paris, Singapore and Abu Dhabi.

Biography
Lanvin was born on April 14, 1954, in Valenciennes, France. He speaks and writes French, English and Spanish, and has a working knowledge of Italian, Portuguese, Russian and some Chinese.

For more than 20 years with the United Nations, Lanvin worked in a number of capacities with UNCTAD, the UN ICT Task Force, and the UN Department of International Economic and Social Affairs

He holds a BA in Mathematics and Physics from the University of Valenciennes (France), an MBA from Ecole des Hautes Etudes Commerciales in Paris, and a PhD in Economics from the University of Paris (La Sorbonne) in France.

Research and publications
Since 1998, Lanvin has published a significant number of articles on the international aspects of e-commerce, e-government, the new economy and efforts to bridge the so-called ‘digital divide’, and national knowledge/IT strategies.

Since 2002, he has been co-authoring the Global Information Technology Report co-published with the World Economic Forum) and the Global Innovation Index (co-published with the World Intellectual Property Organization). Both reports have been used by several governments around the world in assessing and planning their technology and innovation policies.

Lanvin is also a member of numerous boards, including that of The Mohammed Bin Rashid Centre of Government Innovation in Dubai, ICANN, and the Government Technology Agency of Singapore.

Bibliography

References

Lanvin in the media
  How do China and India compare in the global race for talent?
  Bruno Lanvin: "What should we teach children? To learn how to learn"
  India innovates
  The World’s Most Innovative Countries 2016
  "En matière d'innovation, il y a un réel effet Macron en France", estime Bruno Lanvin, directeur des indices mondiaux à l’Insead
  Bruno Lanvin - The future of talent and technology
  https://www.euractiv.com/section/economy-jobs/news/claire-workforce-talent-gap-increases-globally-davos-study-finds/
  Singapore top again in Asia-Pacific on global talent index
  Connecting the Rest of the World: Q&A/ A Chat With Insiders Geoffrey Kirkman and Bruno Lanvin," The New York Times/International Herald Tribune, August 27, 2001.

1954 births
Living people